Jilanabad (also Romanized as Jīlānābād; also known as Golonābād, Golūnābād, Gulnābād, and Qal‘eh-ye Golnābād) is a village in Qahab-e Jonubi Rural District, in the Central District of Isfahan County, Isfahan Province, Iran. At the 2006 census, its population was 1,459, in 351 families.

References 

Populated places in Isfahan County